The chess competitions for the 2013 Bolivarian Games took place in Chiclayo from 19 November to 25 November 2013. Only a women's team event and a mixed team event were contested for medals at these Games.

Medal table
Key:

Medalists

References

Events at the 2013 Bolivarian Games
2013 in chess
2013 Bolivarian Games